The 2022 Skate America was the first event in the 2022–23 ISU Grand Prix of Figure Skating, a senior-level international invitational competition series. It was held at the Tenley E. Albright Performance Center in  Norwood, Massachusetts on October 21–23. Medals were awarded in the disciplines of men's singles, women's singles, pairs, and ice dance. Skaters earned points toward qualifying for the 2022–23 Grand Prix Final.

Entries 
The International Skating Union announced the preliminary assignments on July 22, 2022.

Changes to preliminary assignments

Results

Men

Women

Pairs

Ice dance

References

External links 
 Skate America at the International Skating Union
 

202 Skate America
2022 in figure skating
2022 in American sports
October 2022 sports events in the United States
Norwood, Massachusetts